Miloš Jevtić (born November 3, 1989) is a professional Serbian football player who currently plays for Woodlands Wellington as a defender.

Career
Jevtić joined the S.League in 2014 with the Rams. Previously, he played with FK Dorćol in Serbian League Belgrade.

References

External links
Profile at Goal.com

1989 births
Living people
Serbian footballers
Serbian expatriate footballers
Association football defenders
FK Sinđelić Beograd players
FK BSK Borča players
Expatriate footballers in Singapore
Woodlands Wellington FC players
Singapore Premier League players